David Mendoza Arellano (born 19 October 1970), known as David Mendoza, is a Mexican politician affiliated with the Party of the Democratic Revolution. As of 2014 he served as Deputy of the LX Legislature of the Mexican Congress representing the Federal District.

References

1970 births
Living people
Politicians from Mexico City
Party of the Democratic Revolution politicians
21st-century Mexican politicians
Deputies of the LX Legislature of Mexico
Members of the Chamber of Deputies (Mexico) for Mexico City